Maison Book Girl (stylized as Maison book girl) was a Japanese alternative idol girl group formed in 2014. They released their debut album, Bath Room, on September 23, 2015. They disbanded on May 30, 2021.

History
At Bis' final concert on July 8, 2014, Megumi Koshōji announced that she would form a new idol group. On November 5, the final line-up was revealed. They released their debut singles, "White" and "Black", exclusively at their live shows from March 14, 2015. On March 27, Kaori Sōmoto left the group and Rin Wada joined. The group released their debut studio album, Bath Room, on September 23. On April 30, 2016, they released the EP Summer Continue, followed by the single "River (Cloudy Irony)" on November 30, which would be their first release under Tokuma Shoten. Their second album, Image, was released on April 5, 2017. The single "412" was released on July 19, 2017, followed by "Cotoeri" on December 13,In early 2018, the group signed with UK label, Read The Air Records. They released the single "Elude" on June 20, 2018, which would be their first release under Pony Canyon. Their third studio album, Yume, was released on November 21. The single "Soup" was released on April 3, 2019, followed by "Umbla" on July 31. Their fourth studio album, Umi to Uchu no Kodomotachi, was released on December 18, 2019. Their first compilation album, Fiction, which was due to be released April 29, 2020, was postponed to June 24 due to the COVID-19 pandemic. On May 30, 2021, after Maison book girl's Solitude Hotel concert at Maihama Amphitheater it was announced that the group had disbanded and that a Blu-ray of the concert would be released on August 18.

Members

Final line-up
Megumi Koshōji (コショージ メグミ)
Aoi Yagawa (矢川葵)
Yui Inoue (井上唯)
Rin Wada (和田輪)

Former
Kaori Sōmoto (宗本花音里)

Discography

Studio albums

Compilation albums

Extended plays

Singles

Filmography

Blu-rays

References

External links
Official website

Japanese girl groups
Japanese idol groups
Japanese pop music groups
Musical groups from Tokyo
Musical groups established in 2014
2014 establishments in Japan
Musical groups disestablished in 2021
2021 disestablishments in Japan
Pony Canyon artists